Barak or Berak or Borak in Iran may refer to:
 Barak, Bushehr (برك - Barak)
 Barak, Jahrom, Fars Province (براك - Barāk)
 Berak, Larestan, Fars Province (براك - Berāk)
 Barak, South Khorasan (برك - Barak)